Gokhale Memorial Girls' College is a women's college in Kolkata, established in 1938. The college offers undergraduate degrees and is affiliated with the University of Calcutta. The name commemorates Gopal Krishna Gokhale, one of the founding social and political figures of the Indian Independence Movement. It is often regarded as one of the best colleges in Kolkata and among the top 5 girls colleges in Kolkata.

Departments

Science

Botany
Mathematics
Advertising sales promotion and sales management(major)
Chemistry
Physics
Clinical Nutrition and Dietetics

Arts

Bengali
English
Sanskrit
Hindi
History
Geography
Political Science
Philosophy
Economics
Education
Communicative English
Psychology

Notable alumni
Mamata Shankar, dancer and actress
Srabani Sen, singer
Koyel Mullick, actress
Basabdatta Chatterjee, actress
Dona Ganguly, dancer
Chaiti Ghoshal, actress
Nabaneeta Dev Sen, writer and academic

Accreditation
Gokhale Memorial Girls' College is recognized by the University Grants Commission (UGC). Recently, it has been re-accredited and awarded A grade by the National Assessment and Accreditation Council (NAAC).

See also 
List of colleges affiliated to the University of Calcutta
Education in India
Education in West Bengal

References

External links

University of Calcutta affiliates
Universities and colleges in Kolkata
Women's universities and colleges in West Bengal
Educational institutions established in 1938
1938 establishments in India